is a Japanese manga series written and illustrated by Tsubasa Fukuchi. It was serialized in Shogakukan's shōnen manga magazine Weekly Shōnen Sunday from July 2001 to October 2004, with Its chapters collected in 16 tankōbon volumes. A sequel, The Law of Ueki Plus, was serialized in the same magazine from April 2005 to June 2007, with its chapters collected in five tankōbon volumes. The Law of Ueki was licensed in North America by Viz Media.

A 51-episode anime television series adaptation produced by Studio Deen was broadcast on TV Tokyo from April 2005 to March 2006. In North America, the series was first licensed by Geneon in 2005 and later by Discotek Media in 2018.

Plot

The story starts out with the Battle of the Supernatural Powers, a tournament to decide which Celestial (heavenly being in the original Japanese version) will be the next King of the Celestial World (God in the Japanese version).

Each of the 100 King Candidates (God Candidates in the Japanese version) is required to choose a junior high school student to act as their power user. The student is given a unique power and told to eliminate as many enemies as possible. The winning King Candidate will become the new King of the Celestial World and the winning student will receive the Blank Talent (Black Zai in the Japanese version), a talent that can be anything they choose.

While this leads many students to thoughts of greed and selfishness, Kosuke Ueki decides to take it upon himself to win this tournament to keep that power away from those that would abuse such a gift.

The Law of Ueki Plus
Two years after the tournament in The Law of Ueki, Kosuke Ueki is now a 3rd year student in Hinokuni Junior High School. For some reason, everyone in the real world has lost their memory of their most important person, including his friends who participated in the tournament two years ago. Ueki is the only one unaffected, and is fighting in order to restore everyone's memories. He follows a little sheep named U-lu to another world called Hangekai where he meets new companions and gains new abilities.

Media

Manga

Written and illustrated by Tsubasa Fukuchi, The Law of Ueki was serialized in Shogakukan's Weekly Shōnen Sunday from July 25, 2001, to October 13, 2004. Shogakukan collected its 154 individual chapters in sixteen tankōbon volumes, released from December 18, 2001, to January 14, 2005.

In North America, the manga was licensed for English release by Viz Media in 2005. The sixteen volumes were published from August 8, 2006, to February 10, 2009.
 
A sequel, was serialized in Weekly Shōnen Sunday from April 6, 2005, to June 20, 2007. Its 46 individual chapters were collected in five tankōbon volumes, released from August 8, 2005, to September 18, 2007.

Anime

A 51-episode anime television series adaptation by Studio Deen was broadcast on TV Tokyo from April 4, 2005, to March 27, 2006. The series is directed by Hiroshi Watanabe, with series composition by Toshifumi Kawase and music by Akifumi Tada. Avex collected the series on seventeen DVDs. Episodes 1–27 were released on nine volumes from August 10, 2005, to April 12, 2006. Episodes 28–51 were released on eight volumes from May 10 to December 13, 2006. The first opening theme for episodes 1–32 is "Falco" by Hitomi Shimatani, and the second opening theme for episodes 33–51 is "No Regret" by Kumi Koda. The ending theme for episode 51 is "True Blue" by Hitomi Shimatani.

The anime was originally licensed by Geneon Entertainment. Geneon released the first 36 episodes of the series on nine DVDs. The first volume was released on May 16, 2006, and the last volume on September 18, 2007. ImaginAsian TV broadcast the anime series to the American audience on its Anime EnerG block, starting on January 30, 2007. On July 3, 2008, Geneon and Funimation announced an agreement to distribute select titles in North America. While Geneon would still retain the license, Funimation would assume exclusive rights to the manufacturing, marketing, sales and distribution of select titles. The Law of Ueki was one of several titles involved in the deal. Funimation released the entire series on a DVD box set on June 9, 2009. The rights to the series expired in 2011. In May 2018, Discotek Media announced the acquisition of the series. It was released on Blu-ray Disc on July 31, 2018. The series was added to Crunchyroll's catalog in May 2021.

Video games
The Law of Ueki was also adapted into a PlayStation 2 and Game Boy Advance game released only in Japan. The PlayStation 2 game is called  while the Game Boy Advance game is called . They are based on the story of the anime.

Reception

Manga
Luke Carroll of Anime News Network ranked the first volume as B−. Carroll lauded the concept of Ueki's power to turn trash into trees and the humor of the series, but called it "another run of the mill shounen title". He labeled Fukuchi's art style as "simple" and compared it to One Piece, as "there is vagueness in a lot of detail", but clarified that it is suited to the comedic tone of the story. Michael Aronson of Manga Life ranked the first volume as C+. He criticized the series for its similar premise to other action manga series and for its "overly hyperactive" characters. Aronson concluded; "fans of hyper action series like One Piece and Dragon Ball will feel at home here. Anyone else will merely glaze over and out." Patti Martinson of Sequential Tart gave a 4/10 for the fourth volume. Martinson compared the content of the volume to the anime adaptation, and wrote; "at times the manga made less sense than the DVD did. However, the characterizations seem to be slightly better, but not enough to make me see what happens in the next volume."

Anime
Carlo Santos from Anime News Network criticized the series for its "run-of-the-mill" plot and "ridiculous" characters, calling them "underdeveloped", but stated that the series is "[b]izarre and crazy enough to be entertaining at times". Santos also criticized its "sloppy" artwork, repetitive fights and the English dub, concluding: "Like its titular hero, The Law of Ueki seems energetic and full of promise, but right now lacks the necessary self-control to succeed." Chris Beveridge of AnimeOnDVD commented that the series "is a real hard sell", commenting that the characters are hard to connect with, the pacing of the first episodes is very fast and its plot is "something that we've seen in its most base form a million times now". Beveridge also criticized the series' artwork, which blends traditional and digital animation, calling it "disconnected at times" and that it makes it look like an "unfinished show". Jeremy Mullin of IGN compared the premise of the series to Zatch Bell! and commented that the powers of the characters are similar to those from Fullmetal Alchemist, "with the conversion factor involved", highlighting as well the variety of ways in which they are used. Mullin concluded: "The Law of Ueki was something I was interested in checking out, and it seems to be worth it. It's full of some good ol' fashioned anime craziness with some positive messages thrown in for good measure."

Notes

References

External links

Web Sunday on Law of Ueki Plus 
Avex Mode on The Law of Ueki  
TV Tokyo on The Law of Ueki 

Adventure anime and manga
Anime series based on manga
Comedy anime and manga
Discotek Media
Geneon USA
Shōnen manga
Studio Deen
Supernatural anime and manga
TV Tokyo original programming
Viz Media manga